Maru may refer to:
 Maru, Hormozgan (مارو - Mārū)
 Maru, Lorestan (مرو - Marū)
 Maru, Zanjan (مرو - Marū)